Nottingham South is a constituency of the Parliament of the United Kingdom, represented since 2010 by Lilian Greenwood of the Labour Party.

Members of Parliament 
Since 2010, the seat has been represented by Lilian Greenwood, who succeeded Labour's Alan Simpson on his retirement. Simpson had held the seat since 1992, when he unseated the Conservative Martin Brandon-Bravo.

MPs 1885–1974

MPs since 1983

Constituency profile
The seat is the most economically diverse of the three Nottingham constituencies covering higher income and lower income output areas (sub-divisions of wards). In 2010 it was the most marginal of the seats, changing hands on several occasions over the previous few decades, though is now a very safe Labour seat. There are below-national levels of unemployment claimants, for example at the end of 2010 male claimants were less than half as many as in Nottingham North. The Labour majority has since grown to 6,000 in 2015 and over 15,000 in 2017, making it a safe seat.

The constituency is also the most politically diverse of the three city seats which together form Nottingham City Council. In the 2007 elections for Nottingham City Council, the constituency elected 9 of the 42 Labour councillors, 6 of the 7 Conservatives and 5 of the 6 Liberal Democrats.

Boundaries 

Nottingham South contains at least parts of both of the city's universities. The University of Nottingham's University Park Campus and Jubilee Campus are both in the constituency, as is the Clifton Campus of Nottingham Trent University. Many of these students are based in rows of terraced housing in the Lenton and Radford wards of this seat. A minority of students and much of the universities' staff are based in neighbouring Beeston, but this falls within the Broxtowe constituency.

2010–present: The City of Nottingham wards of Bridge, Clifton North, Clifton South, Dunkirk and Lenton, Leen Valley, Radford and Park, Wollaton East and Lenton Abbey, and Wollaton West.

1983–2010: The City of Nottingham wards of Abbey, Bridge, Clifton East, Clifton West, Lenton, Park, Robin Hood, Wilford, and Wollaton.

1955–1974: The County Borough of Nottingham wards of Bridge, Clifton, Lenton, and Trent, and the Urban District of West Bridgford.

1918–1955: The County Borough of Nottingham wards of Bridge, Castle, Meadows, and Trent.

1885–1918: The Municipal Borough of Nottingham wards of Bridge, Castle, Market, Meadow, St Mary, and Trent.

History
Since as early as 1295, Nottingham was represented by one large constituency which elected two members of parliament to the House of Commons. Under a major Act of 1885 three single-member subdivisions were created: Nottingham East, Nottingham West and Nottingham South.

Nine year absence of the seat
Nottingham South was abolished in the election of February 1974 but was re-formed with altered boundaries nine years later in 1983 from parts of Nottingham East and Nottingham West.

Modern demography
Nottingham South is the most diverse of the three constituencies in terms of economic demographics.  It includes areas of higher incomes than average in the form of Wollaton and The Park Estate and areas of relative poverty, both suburban and inner city. The council estate built next to and within the bounds of the village/parish of Clifton was once the largest in Europe.

Results to date excluding under the Blair Ministry when it was quite firmly Labour have produced the most marginal majorities of Nottingham City's three constituencies. The Conservative Martin Brandon-Bravo held the seat from 1983 to 1992. Since 1992, Nottingham South has been held by Labour MPs; Alan Simpson until retiring from the House of Commons in 2010 and Lilian Greenwood from 2010.

Communities or localities in Nottingham South include:

 Clifton
 Dunkirk
 Hockley Village
 Lace Market
 Leen Valley
 Lenton Abbey
 Lenton
 Parts of Nottingham City Centre
 Radford
 The Meadows
 The Park Estate
 Wollaton

Elections

Elections in the 2010s

Elections in the 2000s

Elections in the 1990s

Elections in the 1980s

Elections in the 1970s

Elections in the 1960s

Elections in the 1950s

Elections in the 1940s

Elections in the 1930s

Elections in the 1920s

Elections in the 1910s

Elections in the 1900s

Elections in the 1890s

Elections in the 1880s

See also 
 List of parliamentary constituencies in Nottinghamshire

Notes

References

Politics of Nottingham
Parliamentary constituencies in Nottinghamshire
Constituencies of the Parliament of the United Kingdom established in 1885
Constituencies of the Parliament of the United Kingdom disestablished in 1974
Constituencies of the Parliament of the United Kingdom established in 1983